Chamsangar Rural District is a rural district (dehestan) in Papi District, Khorramabad County, Lorestan Province, Iran. At the 2006 census, its population was 2,520, in 455 families.  The rural district has 39 villages.

References 

Rural Districts of Lorestan Province
Khorramabad County